Bréard is a French surname. Notable people with the surname include:

Jean-Jacques Bréard (1751–1840), French politician
Lucie Bréard (1902–1988), French runner

See also
Beard (surname)

French-language surnames